The 2021 Chunichi Dragons season is the 85th season of the franchise in Nippon Professional Baseball, also the 85th season in Nagoya, the 75th season under Chunichi Shimbun, and the 27th season in Nagoya Dome. This is also the 3rd and final season under manager Tsuyoshi Yoda. He was replaced by Kazuyoshi Tatsunami for 2022.

Regular season 
The Dragons finished in 5th place, going 55-71-17, with a .437 winning percentage, 19 games back of the Tokyo Yakult Swallows.

References

2021 Nippon Professional Baseball season
Chunichi Dragons seasons